Steak and Ale was an American chain of casual dining restaurants that went bankrupt in 2008.  However the brand, recipes and other intellectual property associated with the former chain are currently owned  by Legendary Restaurant Brands, LLC, the parent company for Bennigan's.

Steak and Ale was founded as an independent restaurant chain in Dallas, Texas, on February 26, 1966, by Norman E. Brinker. On July 29, 2008, the chain's remaining 58 locations closed as part of a Chapter 7 bankruptcy proceeding.
 
In 2014, Bennigan's CEO Paul Mangiamele announced their intended comeback for 2016, but as of August 2020, no locations have opened. Later, it was announced that the first new Steak & Ale location would open in 2021 in Cancún, Mexico. 

In 2018, Legendary Restaurant Brands kept the Steak and Ale brand alive by adding some of the Steak and Ale signature favorites to the Bennigan's menu in 2018 even though Legendary has yet to open a single Steak and Ale restaurant.

Fare
Popular menu items at Steak and Ale included the signature herb-roasted prime rib, Kensington club, New York strip, filet mignon, Hawaiian chicken, and spicy grilled chicken pasta. The restaurant featured an unlimited salad bar or a choice of soup with most of its entrees on the dinner menu. It also featured free drink refills and a honey wheat bread. Steak and Ale also offered a lunch menu with many items for $6.99. During the mid-1990s, in an attempt to revitalize lagging sales, the "Early Evening" menu was introduced. In addition to lower prices, all the "Early Evening" fares included a free beverage and free dessert. Some of the complimentary dessert selections were strawberry sundown cake, twilight triple fudge cake, and spice cake. The restaurant also featured wine samples for only 25 cents.

History
Restaurant pioneer Norman Brinker founded Steak and Ale in 1966 in Dallas. The chain, with its dimly lit Tudor-style decorated dining rooms, billed itself as offering an upscale steak experience at lower prices. It was seen as a model for the casual-dining steakhouse chain, and many executives there went on to run other large chains.

It remained an independent chain until 1976, when Pillsbury purchased it and folded it into its restaurant group with Burger King, Bennigan's, Poppin Fresh Pies and other stores. At the time, the company had 113 locations of Steak and Ale and Jolly Ox (the name Steak and Ale used in markets that did not allow a reference to liquor in a restaurant name).

In 1982, Pillsbury spun off the company and Bennigan's into the independent S&A Restaurant Corp. Steak and Ale grew as one of the first chain dinner houses to its height in the late 1980s with 280 locations, before competition that the brand helped inspire eroded its market presence. In 1988, Metromedia purchased the company. In 1993, the company was merged with the Metromedia Steak Houses chains Bonanza and Ponderosa, and all three chains were operated under the S&A Restaurant Group brand.

The S&A Restaurant Corp bankruptcy in July 2008 affected the Bennigan's restaurant chain, also owned by that company; all of the company-owned stores closed the same day as the Steak and Ale restaurants. Franchised Bennigan's locations remained open.

The MetroMedia Company also owns the Ponderosa and Bonanza Steakhouse chains, which were not affected by the bankruptcy filing; they are operated by a different subsidiary of the company.

Private investment company Oak Point Partners acquired the remnant assets, consisting of any known and unknown assets that weren't previously administered, from the S&A Restaurant Corp., et al., Bankruptcy Estates on August 15, 2013.

Planned revival
In 2013, a Facebook page was created for the comeback of Steak and Ale and Bennigan's CEO Paul Mangiamele announced that the chain will be part of Bennigan's comeback concept.

On February 11, 2015, CEO Paul Mangiamele and his wife, Gwen, closed on a management buyout of the company from its parent private equity firm, for an undisclosed price. The new company, Legendary Restaurant Brands, LLC, is now 100% owner of the Bennigan's restaurant chain, its fast-casual concept Bennigan's On the Fly, and the Steak and Ale brand. As of December 2018, the Bennigan's website is offering potential franchisees the opportunity to "Own A Steak And Ale".

In June 2020, Mangiamele announced that the first revamped Steak & Ale location was under construction and scheduled to open in 2021 in Cancún, Mexico. They are also still seeking franchisees for US locations.

References

Steakhouses in the United States
Restaurant franchises
Defunct restaurant chains in the United States
Defunct restaurants in the United States
Restaurants established in 1966
Restaurants disestablished in 2008
Restaurants in Texas
Re-established companies
Defunct companies based in Texas
Companies that have filed for Chapter 7 bankruptcy
1966 establishments in Texas
Metromedia